"Guilty" is a debut song co-written and recorded by American country music duo The Warren Brothers.  It was released in August 1998 as the first single from the album Beautiful Day in the Cold Cruel World.  The song reached #34 on the Billboard Hot Country Singles & Tracks chart.  The song was written by Brad Warren, Brett Warren and Dave Berg.

Chart performance

References

1998 debut singles
1998 songs
The Warren Brothers songs
Songs written by Dave Berg (songwriter)
Songs written by the Warren Brothers
Song recordings produced by Chris Farren (country musician)
BNA Records singles